The 2018 Asia Rugby Sevens Series was the tenth edition of Asia's continental sevens circuit. The lower-tier Trophy tournament, hosted in Singapore, served as a qualifier, with the top team qualifying for the main series hosted in Hong Kong, South Korea, and Sri Lanka.

 won the 2018 Asia Rugby Sevens Trophy, and qualified to the 2019 Asia Rugby Sevens Series, replacing the eighth placed team of 2018 Asia Rugby Sevens Series. .

Teams

Asia Rugby Sevens Trophy

 
 
 
 
 
 
 
 
 
 
 
 

Asia Rugby Sevens Series

Trophy
The men's trophy was held 4–5 August at Queenstown Stadium in Singapore. All times in Singapore Standard Time (UTC+08:00).

Pool stage

Pool A

Pool B

Pool C

Knockout stage

Bowl

Plate

Cup

Final standings

Main Series

Hong Kong

The tournament was held 14–15 September  in Hong Kong. All times in Hong Kong Time (UTC+08:00).

Pool stage

Pool A

Pool B

Knockout stage

Plate
{{Round4-with third|RD2=Plate Final|Consol=Seventh place|team-width=140

|15 September – 14:24 – HKFC
||28||24
|15 September – 14:46 – HKFC
||40||5

|15 September – 17:02 – HKFC
||15||7

|15 September – 16:40 – HKFC
||14||28
}}CupSri Lanka

The tournament was held 13–14 October  in Colombo. All times in Sri Lanka Standard Time (UTC+05:30).

Pool stagePool APool BKnockout stagePlateCup'''

Final standings

See also
 2018 Asia Rugby Women's Sevens Series

References

2018
2018 rugby sevens competitions
2018 in Asian rugby union
International rugby union competitions hosted by Singapore
International rugby union competitions hosted by Hong Kong
International rugby union competitions hosted by South Korea
International rugby union competitions hosted by Sri Lanka
rugby union
rugby union
rugby union
rugby union